Erythema (from Greek  'red') is redness of the skin or mucous membranes, caused by hyperemia (increased blood flow) in superficial capillaries. It occurs with any skin injury, infection, or inflammation. Examples of erythema not associated with pathology include nervous blushes.

Types 
 Erythema ab igne
 Erythema chronicum migrans
 Erythema induratum
 Erythema infectiosum (or fifth disease)
 Erythema marginatum
 Erythema migrans
 Erythema multiforme (EM)
 Erythema nodosum
 Erythema toxicum
 Erythema elevatum diutinum
 Erythema gyratum repens
 Keratolytic winter erythema
 Palmar erythema

Causes
It can be caused by infection, massage, electrical treatment, acne medication, allergies, exercise, solar radiation (sunburn), photosensitization, acute radiation syndrome, mercury toxicity, blister agents, niacin administration, or waxing and tweezing of the hairs—any of which can cause the capillaries to dilate, resulting in redness. Erythema is a common side effect of radiotherapy treatment due to patient exposure to ionizing radiation.

Diagnosis
Erythema disappears on finger pressure (blanching), whereas purpura or bleeding in the skin and pigmentation do not. There is no temperature elevation, unless it is associated with the dilation of arteries in the deeper layer of the skin.

See also 
 Hyperemia
 Flushing (physiology)
 List of cutaneous conditions

References

External links 

Dermatologic terminology
Radiation health effects
Symptoms and signs: Skin and subcutaneous tissue